The Amitāyurdhyāna Sūtra (Sanskrit; , Guan-wuliangshou-jing; Vietnamese: Phật Thuyết Kinh Quán Vô Lượng Thọ Phật; English: Sutra on the Visualization of [the Buddha] Immeasurable Life) is a Mahayana sutra in Pure Land Buddhism, a branch of Mahāyāna Buddhism. 

It is one of the three principle Pure Land sutras along with the Longer Amitabha Sutra and the Shorter Amitabha Sutra. Amitāyus is another name for the Buddha Amitābha, the preeminent figure in Pure Land Buddhism, and this sūtra focuses mainly on meditations involving complex visualizations. This is reflected in the name of the sūtra, which translates to the "Amitāyus Meditation Sūtra." It is believed to have first been composed in Chinese in the 5th century.

Title 
The name of the sūtra translates to the "Amitāyus Meditation Sūtra." According to Paul Williams, a more accurate Sanskrit title for this text would be Amitāyurbuddhānusmṛti Sūtra, meaning "Amitāyus Buddha-mindfulness Sūtra."

History 

According to tradition, it was translated into Chinese by a monk named Kalayashas between 424 and 442 AD. However, it is generally considered by modern scholarship to be apocryphal, a composition originally written in Chinese. 

No Sanskrit original has been discovered and the Sanskrit name and Sanskrit versions would thus be reverse translations.The text also shows Chinese influences, including references to earlier translations of Chinese Pure Land texts. Modern scholars generally accept that the text describes a meditation which was practiced in Central Asia, but with Chinese additions.

Basic Outline of the Sutra

Preliminary matters
The text begins with a story where a prince named Ajātasattu was enticed by the villain Devadatta to murder his father, King Bimbisara, in order to ascend the throne. Ajātasattu kills his father, and nearly kills his mother, Queen Vaidehi, but after advice from his other ministers, he relented and threw his mother in prison.

Lamenting her fate, Queen Vaidehi prays to Gautama Buddha for help, and he is able to visit her. Vaidehi expresses her wish to be born in Amitābha's pure land. Shakyamuni smiles, emitting light from his mouth, and goes on to tell Vaidehi how to be reborn in the Pure Land. The Buddha tells her that although she is in prison, she could still obtain liberation through the practices of Amitābha. The Buddha goes on to describe Amitābha and how one could obtain rebirth in his land of Sukhavati.

This tale references historical incidents of the Haryanka dynasty of Magadha, India, and the religious tension between Gautama Buddha and his brother-in-law, Devadatta.

Attaining birth in the Pure Land
Shakyamuni explains the importance of performing certain meritorious acts in order to be reborn in the Pure Land. He then goes on to teach Vaidehi how to visualize the Pure Land, to further her efforts in attaining rebirth there. Shakyamuni describes thirteen "contemplations," or mental visualization exercises, that are to be followed in order. By deeply contemplating various aspects of the Pure Land and attempting to visualize them in detail, the aspirant draws closer to the Pure Land.

The thirteen contemplations are described in order as follows:

 Contemplation of the setting sun
 Contemplation of an expanse of water
 Contemplation of the ground in the pure land
 Contemplation of trees in the pure land
 Contemplation of ponds in the pure land
 Contemplation of various objects in the pure land
 Contemplation of the lotus throne of the Buddha
 Contemplation of the image of Amitābha
 Contemplation of Amitābha himself
 Contemplation of Avalokiteśvara
 Contemplation of Mahasthamaprapta
 Contemplation of the aspirants to the pure land
 Contemplation of Amitābha and the two bodhisattvas

Nine levels of birth
In the final part of the sutra, Gautama Buddha discusses the nine levels into which those born into the Pure Land are categorized. The levels are ranked from highest to lowest as follows:

 The highest level of the highest grade
 The middle level of the highest grade
 The lowest level of the highest grade
 The highest level of the middle grade
 The middle level of the middle grade
 The lowest level of the middle grade
 The highest level of the lowest grade
 The middle level of the lowest grade
 The lowest level of the lowest grade

According to the Buddha, all nine grades of human beings can achieve rebirth into the Pure Land if they contemplate Amitābha or at least call on his name.  This is similar to the 48 vows made by Amitābha, according to the Infinite Life Sutra, which includes the Primal Vow.

Conclusion
The sutra ends with a short section describing the benefits gained by those who listened to these words of the Buddha. Vaidehi experienced "great awakening with clarity of mind and reached the insight into the non-arising of all dharmas," while her five hundred female attendants and "innumerable devas" also awakened aspiration for the highest enlightenment. Shakyamuni names the sutra, mentions benefits connected with the name of Amitabha Buddha, and exhorts all to hold the words of the sutra in their minds. Shakyamuni then returns through the air to Vulture Peak.

See also
 Longer Sukhāvatīvyūha Sūtra (Infinite Life Sutra)
 Shorter Sukhāvatīvyūha Sūtra (Amitabha Sutra)
 Pure Land Buddhism
 Sukhavati
 Amitābha
 Jōdo-shū
 Jōdo Shinshū
 Sutra
 Chinese Buddhism

Notes

Further reading
 
Hisao Inagaki, Harold Stewart (transl.): The Three Pure Land Sutras, Berkeley: Numata Center for Buddhist Translation and Research 2003.  PDF retrieved 2013/07/28
 Pas, Julian F. (1974). Shan-tao's Interpretation of the Meditative Vision of Buddha Amitāyus, History of Religions 14 (2), 96-116 
 Takakusu, J. (trans.), Friedrich Max Müller, ed.: Amitayurdhyana Sutra. In: The Sacred Books of the East, Volume XLIX: Buddhist Mahāyāna Texts, Part II. Oxford: Clarendon Press, 1894   Internet Archive
Tanaka, Kenneth K. 1990. The Dawn of Chinese Pure Land Buddhist Doctrine: Jìngyǐng Huìyuán's Commentary on the Visualization Sūtra. Albany: State University of New York Press.
 Johnson, Peter, trans. (2020). The Land of Pure Bliss, On the Nature of Faith & Practice in Greater Vehicle (Mahāyāna) Buddhism, Including a Full Translation of Shàndǎo’s Commentary in Four Parts Explaining The Scripture About Meditation on the Buddha ‘Of Infinite Life’ (Amitāyur Buddha Dhyāna Sūtra, 觀無量壽佛經), An Lac Publications,

External links
 The Contemplation Sutra, translated into English by J. Takakusu
 English translation of the Contemplation Sutra 
 The Taima Mandala Image of the Pure Land from a medieval Japanese scroll, based on the descriptions found in the Contemplation Sutra. This site offers explanations in English of the various motifs of the scroll.
  The Scripture on the Buddha’s Teaching About Meditation On the Enlightened Being ‘Of Infinite Life’ , from The Land of Pure Bliss, On the Nature of Faith & Practice in Greater Vehicle (Mahāyāna) Buddhism, translated by Peter Johnson, 

Pure Land Buddhism
Mahayana sutras
Post-canonical Buddhist texts
Chinese Buddhist texts